The National Bowl Game is an independently operated annual post-season college football all-star game, currently played each December at Municipal Stadium in Daytona Beach, Florida. The game showcases NFL draft prospects of those collegiate players who have completed their eligibility in NCAA Division II, NCAA Division III, and the NAIA. Since 2014, the game has been played as a doubleheader with the FCS Bowl.

History
The National Bowl Game was first played in April 2011 at J. Birney Crum Stadium in Allentown, Pennsylvania. All subsequent games have been held in December, and in 2013 the game moved to Riccardo Silva Stadium on the campus of Florida International University (FIU). The game is organized by East Preps LLC, who operate the game independently. After three years at FIU, the game moved to Municipal Stadium in Daytona Beach, Florida.

The game and an associated scouting combine provide opportunity for players from smaller colleges to get exposure with scouts from various professional leagues, including the NFL and CFL. Organizers report that 26 players from the December 2015 games (National Bowl Game and FCS Bowl) reached the NFL in some capacity. At the December 2016 game, 14 NFL teams were represented, with over 30 scouts in attendance.

Game results

MVPs
Overall MVPs of each game are listed below. Some additional awards not listed are also given, for offensive and defensive player of each team, special teams player, lineman, and the James Pratt Courage Award.

See also
List of college bowl games

References

Further reading

External links
 

College football all-star games
Recurring sporting events established in 2011
NCAA Division II football
NCAA Division III football
American football in Florida
American football in Pennsylvania